Sir John FitzGerald of Dromana ( – 1662 or 1664) was the last of the FitzGeralds of Dromana. He sat as MP for Dungarvan in the Irish Parliament of 1661–1666.

Birth and origins 

 

John was born about 1635 probably at Dromana, the only son of Gerald FitzGerald and his wife Mabel Digby. His father was esquire of Dromana and styled Lord of the Decies. His family was a cadet branch of the FitzGerald of Desmond, an Irish Old English family. The Dromana branch started when Gerald FitzGerald, the second son of James FitzGerald, 6th Earl of Desmond (d. 1462) was given Dromana as appanage.

His mother was the second daughter of Sir Robert Digby and his wife Lettice Digby, 1st Baroness Offaly. Her family was English and Protestant.

Irish Wars 
His father was a protestant like his wife and sided with the government during the Irish Rebellion of 1641 and the ensuing Irish Confederate Wars. He died in 1643 in his early thirties, probably killed in action while fighting the Confederates. Dromana castle had been lost to the insurgents in 1642 or 1643 when his mother surrendered the castle to them. Murrough O'Brien, 6th Baron Inchiquin retook the castle in April 1647.

First marriage and child 
FitzGerald married first in 1658 Katharine, daughter of John Power, 5th Baron Curraghmore and sister of Richard Power, 1st Earl of Tyrone.

John and Katherine had an only daughter:

 Katherine, rich heiress, who married first John Power, 2nd Earl of Tyrone, secondly Edward FitzGerald-Villiers, and thirdly William Steuart

FitzGerald's first wife died on 22 August 1660.

Second marriage 
FitzGerald married secondly Helen, daughter of Donough MacCarty, 1st Earl of Clancarty. The marriage was childless.

House of Commons 
When Charles II summoned the Irish Parliament of 1661–1666, FitzGerald stood for Dungarvan Bourough and was elected as one of its two representatives.

Death 
FitzGerald died in 1662 or 1664.

Notes and references

Notes

Citations

Sources 

 
 
 
 
  – N to R (for Power)
 
 
 

Anglo-Irish families
FitzGerald dynasty
FitzGerald, John